The 1925 Oklahoma Sooners football team was an American football team that represented the University of Oklahoma as a member of the Missouri Valley Conference (MVC) during the 1925 college football season. In its 21st year under head coach Bennie Owen, the team compiled a 4–3–1 record (3–3–1 against MVC opponents), finished in sixth place in the conference, and outscored its opponents by a total of 93 to 44. The team played its home games at Memorial Stadium in Norman, Oklahoma.

No Sooners were recognized as All-Americans, nor did any Sooner receive all-conference honors.

Schedule

References

Oklahoma
Oklahoma Sooners football seasons
Oklahoma Sooners football